The Jordan national futsal team is controlled by the Jordan Football Association, the governing body for futsal in Jordan and represents the country in international futsal competitions.

Tournaments

FIFA Futsal World Cup

AFC Futsal Championship

Futsal at the Asian Indoor and Martial Arts Games

WAFF Futsal Championship

Arab Futsal Championship

Players

Current squad
Players called for the 2018 AFC Futsal Championship.

Previous squads

AFC Futsal Championship
2018 AFC Futsal Championship squads

References

External links
 https://web.archive.org/web/20161116194204/http://www.futsalplanet.com/matches/index.asp

Asian national futsal teams
National sports teams of Jordan
Futsal in Jordan